Hartford railway station is in the village of Hartford, in Cheshire, England. It is situated on the A559 road approximately two miles (3.2 km) west of the town of Northwich.

History

Hartford station was built by the Grand Junction Railway (GJR) and opened in September 1837.  The GJR became a constituent of the newly formed London and North Western Railway on 16 July 1846, which in turn was absorbed by the London Midland and Scottish Railway (LMSR) in 1923. The LMSR was nationalised within British Railways on 1 January 1948 and the station and its train services were thereafter operated by the London Midland Region of BR. The station buildings were greatly rationalised at the time of the West Coast electrification in the 1960s.

Facilities

The station is in a cutting with steps down from the car park. There is a ramp for wheelchairs but it is very steep. The station is staffed; the ticket office is open from start of services until late afternoon during the week and on Saturdays, but limited on a Sunday. There are bus stops and a public phone box on the road.  The centre of the village of Hartford is about 0.8 miles (1.3 km) to the east, about 10–15 minutes walk.

Greenbank railway station is about 1 mile (1.6 km) away, though nearer to Northwich, on the Mid-Cheshire Line from Chester to Manchester Piccadilly.

The station underwent an upgrade in spring 2011; it included new voice announcements, live arrivals and departure boards, and new electronic systems.

Network Rail delivered more improvements to the station in summer 2014. These improvements ranged from replacing the station roof, resurfaced platforms and a new station footbridge.  Step-free access is possible to both platforms via ramps from the nearby road.

Services
Monday to Saturday

Hartford is currently served by two trains an hour, operated by West Midlands Trains, between Liverpool Lime Street railway station and Birmingham New Street railway station.

Sunday

The service reduces to one train per hour in each direction.

References
Notes

Bibliography

External links

Railway stations in Cheshire
DfT Category D stations
Former London and North Western Railway stations
Railway stations in Great Britain opened in 1837
Railway stations served by West Midlands Trains
Stations on the West Coast Main Line